Whiskey Soda Lounge was a bar and Thai restaurant by Andy Ricker in Portland, Oregon's Richmond neighborhood, in the United States. Located across the street from Ricker's Pok Pok restaurant, the whiskey-centric bar closed in 2020, during the COVID-19 pandemic.

Portland
The Portland restaurant began serving happy hour in 2010. The restaurant served brunch from 2016 to 2017.

Oma's Hideaway replaced Whiskey Soda Lounge, after closing during the COVID-19 pandemic.

Brooklyn
Ricker opened a second Whiskey Soda Lounge in Brooklyn, also near a Pok Pok location, in August 2013. It was unable to find a sufficient customer base, and closed less than two years later.

See also
 Impact of the COVID-19 pandemic on the restaurant industry in the United States
 List of defunct restaurants of the United States

References

External links

 Whiskey Soda Lounge at Portland Monthly
 Whiskey Soda Lounge at Travel + Leisure
 Whiskey Soda Lounge at Willamette Week
 Whiskey Soda Lounge at Zagat
 Whiskey Soda Lounge at Zomato

2020 disestablishments in Oregon
Asian-American culture in New York City
Defunct Asian restaurants in Portland, Oregon
Defunct restaurants in New York City
Restaurants disestablished during the COVID-19 pandemic
Restaurants disestablished in 2020
Restaurants in Brooklyn
Richmond, Portland, Oregon
Thai restaurants in Portland, Oregon
Thai restaurants in the United States
Thai-American culture in New York (state)
Year of establishment missing